Uvira Territory is a territory in South Kivu, Democratic Republic of the Congo.

References

Territories of South Kivu Province